Daniel "Dani" Poyatos Algaba (born 23 June 1978) is a Spanish professional football manager he is the currently manager of J1 League club Gamba Osaka. Besides Spain, he has managed in Bahrain, Israel, Greece and Japan.

Managerial career 
Born in Barcelona, Poyatos began working in the youth ranks of hometown club RCD Espanyol. After working for the underage teams of the Bahrain national team and the under-18s of the Catalonia national team, he became the assistant to Jordi Cruyff at Maccabi Tel Aviv in 2017. In July 2018, he returned to Real Madrid and their Juvenil A team, after Guti headed to Beşiktaş J.K. in Turkey.

On 22 July 2020, Poyatos signed as head coach of Panathinaikos on a two-year contract for the start of the 2020–21 season. He lost his competitive debut in Super League Greece on 13 September away to Asteras Tripolis, with the only goal being scored by compatriot Adrián Riera.

After starting the 2020–21 season with just a point in his first three games, Poyatos left the club by mutual consent on 12 October 2020.

On 24 December 2020, Poyatos signed as manager of the 2020 J2 League champions and newly promoted J1 League side Tokushima Vortis ahead of the 2021 season, replacing compatriot Ricardo Rodríguez who left for fellow J1 League side Urawa Red Diamonds.

On 23 November 2022, Poyatos signed as manager of J1 club, Gamba Osaka from the 2023 season.

Managerial statistics 
.

References

1978 births
Living people
Sportspeople from Barcelona
Spanish football managers
Super League Greece managers
Panathinaikos F.C. managers
Spanish expatriate football managers
Spanish expatriate sportspeople in Greece
Expatriate football managers in Greece
Real Madrid CF non-playing staff
J1 League managers
J2 League managers
Tokushima Vortis managers
Gamba Osaka managers